Umang Lai are the group of sacred groves preserved for the local forest deities (with the same title), worshipped by the Meitei people, the predominant ethnic groups, since ancient times in the Himalayan state of Manipur. The groves and the deities are worshipped and their pleasing ceremony is always celebrated every year through a music and dance festival called Lai Haraoba. There are 365 Umang Lais in the state, out of which 166 are identified in the valley regions of the state.

Lists

Umang Lai sacred groves are widely distributed in Imphal East, Imphal West, Thoubal, Kakching and Bishnupur districts of Manipur. 
The following is the list:

Present scenario
Presently, these religiously preserved sacred groves are in the situation of being endangered, due to the lack of proper attention and care. These Umang Lais have become the victims of the encroachment and exploitation.

See also
 Uningthou
Sacred groves of India

Notes
 All the Umang Lais are affiliated to Sanamahism.
 But, Lainingthou Sanamahi, Leimarel Sidabi, and Imoinu Ahongbi are not included in the Umang Lai category.

References

External links
 http://www.dsource.in/resource/sacred-groves-manav-sangrahalay/sacred-groves/umanglai-sacred-grove-manipur

Sacred groves of India
Religion in Manipur